Chalia or Chalía may refer to:
 Chalia (bug), a genus of true bugs in the family Eurybrachidae
 Chalia, a genus of butterflies in the family Psychidae, synonym of Kotochalia
 Chalía River, a river in Argentina
 Chalia (Χαλία), an ancient Greek town of Boeotia
 Chalía, a feminine forename
 Chalía Herrera, a Cuban soprano

See also
Cheilea
Chelia
Chhalia
Shaliah
Shelia